Horta Sud is a comarca in the province of Valencia, Valencian Community, Spain.

Municipalities 

Albal
Alcàsser
Alfafar
Benetússer
Beniparrell
Catarroja
Llocnou de la Corona
Massanassa
Paiporta
Picassent
Sedaví
Silla

 
Comarques of the Valencian Community
Geography of the Province of Valencia